Toqoz or Tuqoz may refer to:
 Toqoz-e Olya
 Toqoz-e Sofla